AM-4030 is an analgesic drug which is a cannabinoid receptor agonist. It is a derivative of HU-210 which has been substituted with a 6β-((E)-3-hydroxyprop-1-enyl) group. This adds a "southern" aliphatic hydroxyl group to the molecule as seen in the CP-series of nonclassical cannabinoid drugs, and so AM-4030 represents a hybrid structure between the classical and nonclassical cannabinoid families, with the 6-hydroxyalkyl chain rigidified with a double bond with defined stereochemistry. This gives AM-4030 a greater degree of selectivity, so while it is still a potent agonist at both CB1 and CB2, it is reasonably selective for CB1, with a Ki of 0.7nM at CB1 and 8.6nM at CB2, a selectivity of around 12x. Resolution of the enantiomers of AM-4030 yields an even more potent compound, although with less selectivity, with the (-) enantiomer AM-4030a having a Ki of 0.6nM at CB1 and 1.1nM at CB2.

See also 
 AM-919
 AM-938

References 

Benzochromenes
Primary alcohols
Phenols
AM cannabinoids